Tweed Shire is a local government area located in the Northern Rivers region of New South Wales, Australia. It is adjacent to the border with Queensland, where that meets the Tasman Sea. It was named for the Tweed River.

The current mayor of Tweed Shire Council is Cr. Chris Cherry.

History
The European history of the Tweed Shire began in 1823 when the Tweed River was explored by John Oxley.
After sheltering on Cook Island (4 km from the river's mouth), Oxely travelled  up river. In 1828, Captain H. J. Rous explored  up the river. Settlers began to arrive in 1828, the first of which were the cedar getters, who came to harvest Great Red Cedars and send them back to England. During the height of the cedar logging industry, the Tweed Valley was one of the wealthiest districts in Australia.

The Municipality of Murwillumbah was created on 25 May 1902, and held its first meeting on 22 August 1902, at which Peter Street was elected its first mayor. On 1 January 1947, the two amalgamated to form Tweed Shire.

Heritage listings
The Tweed Shire has a number of heritage-listed sites, including:
 Murwillumbah, Casino-Murwillumbah railway: Murwillumbah railway station
 High Conservation Value Old Growth forest

Towns and localities

  Tweed Heads 

 Tweed Heads
 Banora Point
 Bilambil
 Bilambil Heights
 Chinderah
 Fingal Head
 Kingscliff
 Piggabeen
 Terranora
 Tweed Heads South
 Tweed Heads West

  Tweed Coast 

 Bogangar
 Cabarita Beach
 Casuarina
 Cudgen
 Duranbah
 Hastings Point
 Kingscliff
 Pottsville
 Round Mountain
 Tanglewood
 Wooyung

  Murwillumbah 

 Murwillumbah
 Bray Park
 Byangum
 Fernvale
 South Murwillumbah

 Villages 

 Burringbar
 Chillingham
 Condong
 Kunghur
 Tomewin
 Tumbulgum
 Tyalgum
 Uki

  Other localities 

 Brays Creek
 Bungalora
 Cedar Creek
 Carool
 Clothiers Creek
 Cobaki
 Cobaki Lakes
 Crystal Creek
 Cudgera Creek
 Doon Doon
 Dum Dum
 Dunbible
 Dungay
 Duroby
 Eungella
 Glengarrie
 Kielvale
 Kings Forest
 Kynnumboon
 Limpinwood
 Midginbil
 Mooball
 Mount Burrell
 Mount Warning
 Nobbys Creek
 North Arm
 Numinbah
 Pumpenbil
 Reserve Creek
 Stokers Siding
 Stotts Creek
 Terragon
 Tygalgah
 Upper Burringbar
 Upper Crystal Creek
 Upper Duroby
 Urliup
 Queensland
 Gold Coast Airport (Tweed Heads part)

Demographics 
At the 2011 census, there were  people in the Tweed local government area, of these 48.2 per cent were male and 51.8 per cent were female. Aboriginal and Torres Strait Islander people made up 3.5 per cent of the population, which was significantly higher than the national and state averages of 2.5 per cent. The median age of people in the Tweed Shire area was 45 years, which was significantly higher than the national median of 37 years. Children aged 0 to 14 years made up 17.8 per cent of the population and people aged 65 years and over made up 22.9 per cent of the population. Of people in the area aged 15 years and over, 47.5 per cent were married and 15.3 per cent were either divorced or separated.

When compared with total population growth of Australia for the same periods, being 5.78 per cent and 8.32 per cent, respectively, population growth in the Tweed local government area was marginally higher than the national average. The median weekly income for residents within the Tweed Shire area was significantly lower than the national average.

At the 2011 census, the proportion of residents in the Tweed local government area who stated their ancestry as Australian or Anglo-Celtic exceeded 80 per cent of all residents (national average was 65.2 per cent). In excess of 59 per cent of all residents in the Tweed Shire nominated a religious affiliation with Christianity at the 2011 census, which was slightly higher than the national average of 50.2 per cent. Meanwhile, as at the census date, compared to the national average, households in the Tweed local government area had a significantly lower than average proportion (5.5 per cent) where two or more languages are spoken (national average was 20.4 per cent); and a significantly higher proportion (91.6 per cent) where English only was spoken at home (national average was 76.8 per cent).

Population

Council
In May 2005, the Governor of New South Wales dismissed the Tweed Shire Council of Mayor Warren Polglase, following a public inquiry which found that the council was improperly influenced by developers involved in a property boom in the area. The inquiry was commissioned by the Minister for Local Government, Tony Kelly, following community concern about the way planning decisions were made. The Minister appointed the director-general of the Department of Local Government, Garry Payne, former Sydney Lord Mayor Lucy Turnbull and former Tweed Shire councillor, Max Boyd as Administrators for the ensuing three years.

Current composition and election method
Tweed Shire Council is composed of seven councillors elected proportionally as one entire ward. The councillors are elected for a fixed four-year term of office. The mayor is elected by the councillors at the first meeting of the council. The most recent election was held on 29 October 2016, and the makeup of the council is as follows:

The current Council, elected in 2016, in order of election, is:

Shire Presidents and Mayors

References

 
Local government areas of New South Wales
Northern Rivers
Tweed Heads, New South Wales